Berts bekäennelser is a diary novel, written by Anders Jacobsson and Sören Olsson and originally published in 1992. It tells the story of Bert Ljung from 15 January to 7 June during the calendar year he turns 15 during the spring term in the 8th grade at school in Sweden. The book uses the 1992 almanac following the Gregorian calendar, but no specific year is mentioned, and the (leap year's day isn't mentioned). Starting with this book, the chapters receive names (and not just dates), and Sonja Härdin changes writing style. Berts bekännelser finishing standard of each chapter is "Hej då – lilltå". Berts was also recorded for radio, at Unga Efter tre back in the early 1990s.

Book cover
The book cover depicts Bert standing at the toilet, watching into the mirror. He has zits, and think he's ugly following Emilia breaking up with him. Using toothpaste, he has written the words "ful" ("ugly") on the floor. Out of the toilet and the trash-basket, two eyes watch out.

Plot
The book opens on 15 January. In January, Torleif moves from Öreskoga, but returns for a visit, now as a tough guy nicknamed "Tora-Liffa". Bert makes plans for the future, intending to have children with Emilia.  If the baby is male, Bert would name it Jerpa, and refers to the plan as Jerpa-projektet ("The Jerpa Project"). Bert's class will collect money for a 9th grade school trip to London. Åke proposes to open a sex club where the girls will undress themselves for men, but the proposal is rejected and instead it's voted for Åke stripping at the next school dance. Åke proposes selling nuclear weapons to the Sami people and use them against the Swedish government,  which he believes oppresses them.

In February, 14-year old Åke illegally rides a souped-up moped without a helmet. Åke crashes into a streetlight and is taken to a hospital. Lill-Erik gets a moped from a lady named Harriet, and together they go on a holiday trip. Harriet also helps Åke, and takes care of him after the moped crash. Rumors also say Emilia has shown interest for being a friend with Harriet.

By February, Emilia begins acting strangely.  She starts coughing when she hears Bert calling her over the telephone, thinks Bert is silly, and expresses positive opinions about Åke. While Jörgen Karlsson and Dödgrävarn in class 8 B fight and run away from the headmaster at the schoolyard, Bert's class has family and consumer science. Bert perceives everything as a form of humor from Emilia's side, and when Lill-Erik tells Bert that Åke encounters his girl, Bert first sees this as humor. When Emilia says she has to do French homework despite studying German, Bert even believes that French is taught during those German lessons. When a bicycle similar to Åke's is parked at the garage driveway of Emilia's parents house, Bert assumes it belongs to Emilia's father.

Bert turns 15 on 21 February, and gets a moped for present. Emilia refuses cake during Bert's birthday party, but gives Bert a bouquet of white carnations. Bert joins a moped gang with three guys in class 8 C, Jan (called "Jaffa"), Thomas (called "Tomas") and Holgersson.

On March 1, Emilia breaks up with Bert, while Åke hides inside her wardrobe.  She says Bert is ugly and a poor singer.  Although, Bert first suspects her to be joking, he develops low self-esteem.  Some days later he notices Åke carrying Emilia on a bicycle. When confronted, Åke claims he and Emilia aren't together and that he just thought Bert and Emilia met too often and sabotaged their relationship.  Feeling down, Bert goes to church, where he meets a girl who tells him she had the same problems when she was fourteen.

Emilia later returns to pick up her things from Bert's and gets bitten in her elbow by Bert's pet turtle, Ove.  Although she doesn't contract sepsis, Bert hopes she will get forced to amputate her arm anyway or at least be forced to take a tetanus shot.

Bert is soon confirmed, with priest Abdon Rehnberg. The priests from the Church of Sweden who first present themselves are Staffan and Maria. Bert thinks Maria looks nice, while Emilia thinks Staffan looks nice. The confirmands sleep overnight in a haunted house, located at a deserted farm.

Bert's grandmother turns 70, and Bert's class participate in a soccer tournament at school, losing 3–4 to class 8 F when Lill-Erik can't decide which foot to use when shooting at 3-3, before class 8 F counter-attacks winning the game.

Åke states that he and Emilia only talk over a "child born on Christmas" and hold hands, but Bert doesn't believe that. In May, Bert, Åke and Lill-Erik sleep overnight in a haunted house. Later during the same month, Bert, Åke and Lill-Erik sleep overnight at Ekeboskogen, where according to rumors a UFO is said to have been seen. Bert, Åke and Lill-Erik also babysit a family where a 4 years old threatens to hit Lill-Erik, and chases him with a knife through the apartment.

In May, Bert also falls in love with Gabriella, in class 6 at Blåsjöskolan. Gabriella is called "Gabby", and her sister is called Amanda.

The book ends on 7 June, with Bert planning for the upcoming summer, where he will travel to Spain and hold a summer job at a cracker factory.

Trivia
Emilia breaks up with Bert at Emilia's home on 1 March in the 8th grade, which is exactly the same date two years after Bert breaks up with Nadja in the 6th grade.
The book features lyrics from the Heman Hunters songs Heaven and Panncake and Svenska kannibaler, the first of them was also recorded at the May cassette tape recording of "Berts vidare betraktelser" (replacing "Take the Night" from the book version).
The opening lines for the chapter "Lill-Erik och skäggväxten" (30/5), who are "Tjing, tjing - rymdling", was even used as closing lines for the TV series episode "Närkontakt i sjätte klassen".

References 

Berts bekännelser, Rabén & Sjögren, 1992

1992 children's books
Sequel novels
Bert books
Christianity in fiction
Rabén & Sjögren books
1992 Swedish novels